Datana contracta, the contracted datana,  is a moth of the  family Notodontidae. It is found from Maine to Florida west to Arkansas and Wisconsin.

The wingspan is 35–50 mm.

The larvae have been recorded feeding on the foliage of blueberries, hickories, oaks, sycamore, and witch-hazel. In Alabama, it has been found on water, laurel and sawtooth oaks.

External links
Bug Guide
Images
Species info

Notodontidae
Moths of North America
Moths described in 1855